Asuridia ridibunda is a moth of the family Erebidae. It is found in Indonesia.

References

Nudariina
Moths described in 1904